Julien Cétout (born 2 January 1987 or 2 January 1988) is a French former professional footballer who played as a right-back.

Career
Having spent a number of years at both Tours FC and AS Nancy, Cétout joined Béziers in January 2019, after having his contract cancelled by Hapoel Be'er Sheva.

Personal life
Born in France, Cetout is of Guadeloupean descent.

References

External links

1980s births
Living people
French people of Guadeloupean descent
French footballers
Association football midfielders
Ligue 1 players
Ligue 2 players
Luxembourg National Division players
Tours FC players
AS Nancy Lorraine players
AS Béziers (2007) players
US Mondorf-les-Bains players
French expatriate footballers
French expatriate sportspeople in Luxembourg
Expatriate footballers in Luxembourg